Man's Woman (Swedish: Mans kvinna) is a 1945 Swedish historical drama film directed by Gunnar Skoglund and starring Edvin Adolphson, Birgit Tengroth and Holger Löwenadler. It was shot at the Råsunda Studios in Stockholm. The film's sets were designed by the art director Nils Svenwall. It is based on the 1933 novel of the same title by Vilhelm Moberg.

Cast
 Edvin Adolphson as 	Håkan
 Birgit Tengroth as 	Märit
 Holger Löwenadler as 	Påvel
 Erik Berglund as 	Herman
 Gudrun Brost as 	Elin
 Aurore Palmgren as 	Karna
 Carl Deurell as Elder
 Torsten Hillberg as 	Constable
 Olof Krook as 	Man in village
 Segol Mann as 	Man in village
 Per-Axel Arosenius as 	Man in village
 Einar Söderbäck as 	Man in village
 Anna Olin as 	Woman in village
 Signe Wirff as 	Woman in village
 Kerstin Rabe as 	Woman in village
 Gun Adler as 	Tora
 Edla Rothgardt as 	Woman in village
 Gard Cederborg as 	Woman in village
 Fylgia Zadig as 	Woman in village

References

Bibliography 
 Qvist, Per Olov & von Bagh, Peter. Guide to the Cinema of Sweden and Finland. Greenwood Publishing Group, 2000.

External links 
 

1945 films
1945 drama films
1940s Swedish-language films
Films directed by Gunnar Skoglund
Swedish black-and-white films
Swedish historical drama films
1940s historical drama films
Films set in the 19th century
Films based on Swedish novels
1940s Swedish films